Chico (Spanish for "little") is the most populous city in Butte County, California, United States. Located in the Sacramento Valley region of Northern California, the city had a population of 101,475 in the 2020 census, reflecting an increase from 86,187 in the 2010 Census. Chico is the cultural and economic center of the northern Sacramento Valley, as well as the largest city in California north of the capital city of Sacramento. The city is known as a college town, as the home of California State University, Chico, and for Bidwell Park, one of the largest urban parks in the world.

History

The first known inhabitants of the area now known as Chico—a Spanish word meaning "little"—were the Mechoopda Maidu Native Americans.

The City of Chico was founded in 1860 by John Bidwell, a member of one of the first wagon trains to reach California in 1843. During the American Civil War, Camp Bidwell (named for John Bidwell, by then a brigadier general of the California Militia), was established a mile outside Chico, by Lt. Col. A. E. Hooker with a company of cavalry and two of infantry, on August 26, 1863.

By early 1865 it was being referred to as Camp Chico when a post called Camp Bidwell was established in northeast California, later to be Fort Bidwell. The city became incorporated January 8, 1872.

Chico was home to a significant Chinese American community when it was first incorporated, but arsonists burned Chico's Chinatown in February 1886, driving Chinese Americans out of town.

Historian W.H. "Old Hutch" Hutchinson identified five events as the most seminal in Chico history. They included the arrival of John Bidwell in 1850, the arrival of the California and Oregon Railroad in 1870, the establishment in 1887 of the Northern Branch of the State Normal School, which later became California State University, Chico (Chico State), the purchase of the Sierra Lumber Company by the Diamond Match Company in 1900, and the development of the Army Air Base, which is now the Chico Municipal Airport.

Several other significant events have unfolded in Chico more recently. These include the construction and relocation of Route 99E through town in the early 1960s, the founding of Sierra Nevada Brewing Company in 1979—what would become one of the top breweries in the nation—and the establishment of a "Green Line" on the western city limits as protection of agricultural lands.

Geography 

Chico is at the Sacramento Valley's northeast edge, one of the richest agricultural areas in the world. The Sierra Nevada mountains lie to the east and south, with Chico's city limits venturing several miles into the foothills.

Chico sits on the Sacramento Valley floor close to the foothills of the Cascade Range to the north and the Sierra Nevada range to the east and south. Big Chico Creek is the demarcation line between the ranges. The city's terrain is generally flat, with increasingly hilly terrain beginning at the eastern city limits.

The city is bisected by Bidwell Park, which runs  from the flat city center deep into the foothills.

The city is also traversed by two creeks and a flood channel, which feeds the Sacramento River. They are named Big Chico Creek, Little Chico Creek, and Lindo Channel (also known as Sandy Gulch, locally).

The city has been designated a Tree City USA for 31 years by the National Arbor Day Foundation.

Chico is made up of many districts and neighborhoods, including Downtown Chico, the South Campus neighborhood, and Barber.

Climate 
Chico and the Sacramento Valley have a Mediterranean climate (Köppen Csa), with hot, dry summers and cool, wet winters.
Temperatures can rise well above  in the summer. Chico is one of the top metropolitan areas in the nation for number of clear days. 
 
Winters are cool and wet, with the most rainfall coming in January. Tule fog is sometimes present during the autumn and winter months.

Demographics 

The 2010 United States Census reported that Chico had a population of 86,187, which represents an increase of 43.8% since 2000 and a continuation of steady population increase since 1940. The racial makeup of Chico was 69,606 (80.8%) White, 1,771 (2.1%) African American, 1,167 (1.4%) Native American, 3,656 (4.2%) Asian, 210 (0.2%) Pacific Islander, 5,437 (6.3%) from other races, and 4,340 (5.0%) from two or more races. There were 13,315 people of Hispanic or Latino origin, of any race (15.4%).

The Census reported that 83,009 people (96.3% of the population) lived in households, 2,591 (3.0%) lived in non-institutionalized group quarters, and 587 (0.7%) were institutionalized.

There were 34,805 households, out of which 9,222 (26.5%) had children under the age of 18 living in them, 11,745 (33.7%) were heterosexual living together, 3,975 (11.4%) had a female householder with no husband present, 1,729 (5.0%) had a male householder with no wife present. There were 2,806 (8.1%) unmarried heterosexual partnerships, and 295 (0.8%) same sex married couples or partnerships. Ten thousand four hundred nineteen households (29.9%) were made up of individuals, and 3,100 (8.9%) had someone living alone who was 65 years of age or older. The average household size was 2.38. There were 17,449 families (50.1% of all households); the average family size was 2.97.

The population was spread out, with 16,771 people (19.5%) under the age of 18, 20,622 people (23.9%) aged 18 to 24, 22,360 people (25.9%) aged 25 to 44, 17,256 people (20.0%) aged 45 to 64, and 9,178 people (10.6%) who were 65 years of age or older. The median age was 28.6 years. For every 100 females, there were 98.2 males. For every 100 females age 18 and over, there were 96.8 males.

The homeowner vacancy rate was 2.0%; the rental vacancy rate was 5.8%. Thirty-six thousand eight people (41.8% of the population) lived in owner-occupied housing units, and 47,001 people (54.5%) lived in rental housing units.

Economy 

Much of the local economy is driven by the presence of Chico State. Industries providing employment: educational, health and social services (30.3%), retail trade (14.9%), arts, entertainment, recreation, accommodation, and food services (12.6%).

Sierra Nevada Brewing Company, the largest craft brewer in the U.S., is based in Chico.

Chico has always been a regional retail shopping destination. Chico's largest retail district is focused around the Chico Mall on East 20th Street. In the two decades since the Chico Mall was constructed, many national retailers have located nearby, including Target, Kohl's, Forever 21, Best Buy, and Walmart. In January 2008, plans were unveiled to remodel the Chico Mall by demolishing the westernmost portion of the mall (previously home to Troutman's) and constructing an open-air "lifestyle" shopping center that will connect the mall with the Kohl's shopping center nearby. This has since been amended as Dick's Sporting Goods has renovated both the interior and exterior of the space formerly occupied by Troutmans and officially opened on July 10, 2013.

Chico is also home to the North Valley Plaza Mall, the city's first enclosed shopping center. Construction on this mall began in 1965, and it was the county's largest shopping center until the Chico Mall was completed in 1988. For a few years, the "old" mall and the "new" mall competed against one another. The North Valley Plaza Mall was dealt a blow when JCPenney, one of the old mall's anchors, moved to the Chico Mall in 1993. The "old" mall slowly declined with increasing vacancies. After several failed attempts at revitalization, the North Valley Plaza Mall was overhauled in 2002, with the center of the mall demolished. Several large retailers, such as Trader Joe's, and Tinseltown Theater, are operating at the mall plus several restaurants. Mervyn's anchored the mall at the west end, filling the spot vacated by JCPenney, but declared bankruptcy in 2008 and liquidated its entire stock by the end of December of that year. The entire Mervyn's chain ceased operations just before the end of the year. A portion of the space is now being utilized by Goodwill. Other North Valley Plaza spaces include a dollar store, a 99 cent only store, a U.S. Navy recruiting center, and many smaller boutiques.

Chico's downtown is a thriving area for unique, independent retail stores and restaurants. Farmers markets attract crowds on Saturday mornings and Thursday evenings. City Plaza hosts free concerts regularly during the summer. Performance venues large and small, bars, coffee shops, bookstores, and city offices contribute to a lively and flavorful experience.

Agriculture

Almonds are the number one crop in Chico and the surrounding area, only recently edging out rice. Other crops in the area include walnuts, kiwis, olives, peaches, and plums.

The city is bounded on the west by orchards with thousands of almond trees, and there are still a few pockets of orchards remaining within the contiguous city limits. The trees bloom with a pink/white flower in late February or early March. Millions of bees are brought in for pollination. The nuts are harvested in late August. 

Walnuts are also major agricultural products in the area north and west of town. Unlike the almond crops of the area, walnuts do not have the same appeal as they do not bloom in the spring. However, the trees themselves grow much larger, live longer, and are far more resilient to harsh weather than almond trees, which are known to be sensitive to frost and can be felled easily in winter storms. In the area, Walnuts are harvested following the almond harvest season, beginning in mid to late September and stretching well into October. The walnut variety Chico is named after the city.

Top employers

Build.com (as of April 2013) was named as No. 81 on Internet Retailer Magazine's Top 500 List of online retailers. According to Zippia, the Top 10 employers in Chico are below.

Culture 

The Chico Museum first opened in February 1986 in the former Carnegie Library building in downtown Chico. It currently features a World War I exhibit. The museum has two main galleries, which host a variety of temporary and traveling exhibits. In addition, the museum has two smaller, permanent galleries displaying the diverse history of Chico.

The Chico Air Museum is an aviation museum, which opened in 2004. Several aircraft and exhibits are displayed in and adjacent to an old hangar, one of the few remaining from World War II.

Classes are available as well for those new to yo-yo and those who just want to get better. An art museum, the Chico Art Center, is also located in the city.

Two other historical buildings are also museums. Bidwell Mansion is a Victorian house completed in 1868 and the former home of John and Annie Bidwell. Bidwell Mansion is a California State Historical Park. Stansbury House, former home of physician Oscar Stansbury, is a museum of 19th-century life, completed in 1883.

The Valene L. Smith Museum of Anthropology on the Chico State campus presents temporary exhibits researched, designed, and installed primarily by students. The museum was renamed November 18, 2009, by the Chico State Board of Trustees in honor of professor emerita Valene L. Smith, whose contributions and commitments to the museum have totaled over $4.6 million. The grand opening was held on January 28, 2010. The museum is across from the main entrance of the Miriam Library, next to the Janet Turner Print Museum.

The Gateway Science Museum is a leading center for science education and Northern California's local history, natural resources, seacoast, Sacramento Valley, and surrounding foothills and mountains.

About 40 murals and several galleries can be found in the city, including Chico Paper Company, 1078 Gallery, Avenue 9, The Space, 24-Hour Drive-By, and numerous other galleries. The theatres in Chico include Blue Room Theatre,  Chico Performances, Chico Theater Company, and California Regional Theatre. The California State University, Chico Theatre Department also offers a variety of entertainment throughout the school year. In 2003, author John Villani named Chico one of the top 10 Best Small Art Towns in America.

Sports 

Chico is home to Nettleton Stadium (also called The Net) baseball stadium on the California State University campus. It is the home field for the Chico State Wildcats baseball team, in NCAA Division 2.

Chico is also home to the Silver Dollar Speedway, a race track at the Silver Dollar Fairgrounds used for sprint car racing.

Chico is one of few cities to be home to two championship baseball teams in two different leagues simultaneously. The Chico State Wildcats were champions in both the 1997 and 1999 Division II College World Series. The Chico Heat were also champions in the Western Baseball League in 1997.  The Chico Outlaws were founded with the Golden Baseball League in 2005, where they also won the championship in 2007 and 2010. Starting in the summer of 2016, the Chico Heat returned as a part of the Great West League, a collegiate summer wood-bat league, until 2018 when the league folded due to financial issues from several other participating teams.

Chico has also gained a reputation as being a bicycle-friendly city. In 1997, Chico was ranked as the number one cycling city in the nation by Bicycle Magazine and also hosts the Wildflower Century, an annual  bike ride throughout Butte County every April, put on by Chico Velo Cycling Club. The city is in the process of creating a network of bicycle paths, trails, and lanes.

Chico is the former home of the Chico Rooks (soccer), the Chico Heat (baseball – Western Baseball League), and Chico Outlaws (baseball – Golden Baseball League).

Government 

The City of Chico is a charter city and has a council–manager government. The City of Chico's administration offices are located at 411 Main Street, immediately adjacent to the City Council Chambers. Chico's city council consists of seven nonpartisan councilmembers each elected from one of the seven districts in November of even-numbered years. The districts were officially created in February 2020.

Their terms begin on the first Tuesday in December and end on the first Tuesday in December four years thereafter. The mayor is chosen by and from among the council members and serves for two years. City council meetings are on the first and third Tuesday of each month.

The council consists of Mayor Andrew Coolidge, Vice Mayor Kasey Reynolds, Sean Morgan, Dale Bennett, Deepika Tandon, Tom van Overbeek, and Addison Winslow.

Chico is represented in the Butte County Board of Supervisors by the District Two Supervisor Debra Lucero and the District Three Supervisor Tami Ritter.

Chico was designated to be the provisional capital of California if a disaster occurred that would cause evacuation of Sacramento after a Civil Defense exercise named Operation Chico was deemed a success. No person shall produce, test, maintain, or store within the city a nuclear weapon, component of a nuclear weapon, nuclear weapon delivery system, or component of a nuclear weapon delivery system under penalty of Chapter 9.60.030 of the Chico Municipal Code.

Education 

The Chico Unified School District serves all of the greater Chico area, including areas not within the city limits. Public high schools include Chico High School and Pleasant Valley High School.

In 1998, city voters approved a bond to build a third comprehensive high school that was to be called Canyon View High School. However, after a long search for a suitable site, the school district opted not to build the new high school, a decision based largely on declining enrollment figures. The money from the bond has now been used to improve the Chico and Pleasant Valley high schools.

Higher Education
California State University, Chico (Chico State)
Butte College
Cal Northern School of Law

Media 
 
Chico is served by several print newspapers, including the Chico Enterprise-Record, the Chico News & Review, The Orion, and by Videomaker Magazine.

Local television broadcasts include KCVU-TV (Fox), KHSL-TV (CBS), KNVN-TV (NBC), and KRCR-TV (ABC).

Local FM radio broadcasts include: KALF (FM) 95.7, KBQB (FM) 92.7, KCEZ (FM) 102.1, KCHO (FM) 91.7, KPAY-FM 93.9, KHHZ (FM) 97.7, KHSL-FM 103.5, KMXI (FM) 95.1, KRQR (FM),  106.7, KTHU (FM) 100.7, KZAP (FM) 96.7, KZFR (FM) 90.1.

Local AM stations include KPAY 1290 and KZSZ 107.5.

Transportation 

Amtrak operates the Chico Amtrak station at Fifth and Orange Streets for the Coast Starlight service. The terminal is partially wheelchair accessible, has an enclosed waiting area, public restrooms, public payphones, free short-term and long-term parking. Trains run between Seattle and Los Angeles with a northbound and a southbound train departing from the station daily. The Greyhound bus station is also located at Fifth and Orange Streets.

The B-Line (Butte Regional Transit) serves the Chico Urban area with eight routes operating Monday through Saturday and two shuttle routes for Chico State students during the academic year.

Chico is a gold level bicycle-friendly community as designated by the League of American Bicyclists. Chico was also named "America's Best Bike Town" by Bicycle magazine in 1997.
Pedicabs are commonly available downtown during the evenings.

California State Route 99 and California State Route 32 intersect in Chico.

Air 
Chico Municipal Airport serves the area and is north of the city limits. It was served by United Airlines' United Express flights operated by SkyWest Airlines nonstop to San Francisco (SFO). Commercial passenger flights were discontinued by SkyWest on December 2, 2014, due to nonviability, as indicated by United Airlines in June 2014. The city administration is trying to restore air service, which would be provided by alternate airlines. On July 31, 1961, the first-ever aircraft hijacking on United States soil occurred at the Chico Municipal Airport. Two men were critically wounded, and the hijacker was sentenced to more than 30 years in prison.

In the early 1980s, the airport was the home base and headquarters for Pacific Express, a scheduled passenger airline that served Chico with British Aircraft Corporation BAC One-Eleven twin jets.  From 1962 to 2010, the airport was also home to Aero Union, a company that refitted and operated surplus military aircraft such as the Lockheed P-3 Orion turboprop as fire fighting aircraft for state and federal agencies until their move to McClellan Airfield, near Sacramento.

Another local airfield is Ranchaero Airport, surrounded by orchards on the west edge of Chico.

An altitude record for unmanned gas balloons was set in Chico in October 1972. The record was broken on May 23, 2002.

Top Gun: Maverick was filmed in the foothills outside Chico in July 2019 for the final scenes between the F-14 and two SU-57's, which was performed using two L-39's and CGI. The film crew spent 10 days filming and secretly used the Chico Airport for a staging area.

Sister cities 
 – Tamsui, New Taipei, Taiwan 1985
 – Pascagoula, Mississippi (U.S.) 2005

Notable people 

 Emily Azevedo, Olympian, world champion in bobsled
 Annie Bidwell, civil rights leader
 John Bidwell, pioneer and founder of Chico
 Big Poppa E, slam poet
 Joseph Bottom, swimmer, Olympic silver medalist, NCAA and world champion
 Lisa Butts, national team player, women's rugby
 Brian Cage, professional wrestler
 Glynnis Talken Campbell, author, composer, musician, and voice actor.
 Bill Carter, documentary filmmaker, author
 Raymond Carver, writer
 Eugene A. Chappie, politician
 Pat Clements, professional baseball pitcher
 Edwin Copeland, botanist, founder University of the Philippines Los Banos College of Agriculture
 Clay Dalrymple, professional baseball catcher
 Leslie Deniz, Olympic silver medalist in discus
 Amanda Detmer, actress
 Ashley Everett, dancer, lead backup dancer, and dance captain for Beyoncé
 Pat Gillick, executive in Baseball Hall of Fame
 Ken Grossman, founder, Sierra Nevada Brewing Company
 Jerry Harris, sculptor
 Russell Hayden, actor
 Joseph Hilbe, Chico State University graduate, author, professor, statistician
 Marty James, musician
 Mat Kearney, musician
 Lisa Kelly, radio personality
 Adnan Khashoggi, billionaire businessman
 Kurt Kitayama, professional golfer
 Janja Lalich, author, professor, sociologist
 Harold Lang, dancer and actor
 Major Ted W. Lawson, U.S. Army Air Forces pilot
 Kyle Lohse, MLB pitcher, 2011 World Series champion
 Pat Mastelotto, musician
 Michael Messner, notable author, sociologist
 William Morris, glass artist
 The Mother Hips, musical artists
 Joe Nelson, professional baseball player
 Matt Olmstead, writer and producer
 Elena Orlando, professional ice hockey player
 Andranik Ozanian, Armenian general and activist
 Pete Parada, professional musician, drummer for The Offspring
 Kathleen Patterson, politician
 Michael Perelman, author, economist, professor 
 Jackson Pollock, abstract expressionist painter
 Aaron Rodgers, quarterback, Super Bowl champion and 4-time NFL MVP
 Jordan Rodgers, SEC Network sportscaster
 Ed Rollins, political consultant
 Jason Ross, TV writer
 Rigoberto Sanchez, professional football punter
 Mike Sherrard, professional football player, Super Bowl XXIV champion
 Carolyn S. Shoemaker, astronomer
 Robert C. Stebbins, herpetologist and illustrator
 Gentry Stein, world yo-yo champion and performer
 Jeff Stover, professional football player
 Mike Thompson, politician
 Douglas Tilden, sculptor
 Niki Tsongas, politician, widow of Paul Tsongas
 Muddy Waters, coach in College Football Hall of Fame
 Bill Wattenburg, scientist, radio talk show host
 Don Young, politician

See also 

College town

References

External links

Chico Chamber of Commerce

 
Cities in Butte County, California
Former county seats in California
Geography of the Sacramento Valley
Incorporated cities and towns in California
Populated places on the Sacramento River
Nuclear-weapon-free zones
Shasta Cascade
Populated places established in 1872
1872 establishments in California